The Embassy of Japan in Seoul (Hanja: 駐 大韓民國 日本 大使館) is the diplomatic mission of Japan in South Korea. It is located in Seoul, South Korea's capital.

History
The current embassy was opened on 18 December 1965, following the re-establishment of relations between the two countries, under its first ambassador, Toshikatsu Maeda.

In addition to this embassy, Japan also has two consulates in South Korea: one in Busan and one in Jeju.

Description
The building has been described as "a large, red brick structure surrounded by high, barbed-wire-topped walls and guarded at all hours by dozens of police officers". In 2015, renovation work begun on the embassy's current building, built in 1976.

Demonstrations
The embassy is known as the site of numerous South Korean anti-Japanese demonstrations. In 1974 the embassy was ransacked by angry protesters, during a time of heightened tensions between Japan and South Korea. In 2005 two South Koreans sliced off their fingers during a protest related to the Liancourt Rocks dispute, outside the embassy. In 2012 a South Korean driver rammed his truck against the gate of the embassy, claiming it was done to highlight the Liancourt Rocks dispute.

Comfort women protests

Since 1992 the embassy has been a site of weekly  Wednesday demonstrations, related to the comfort women issue. The controversial Statue of Peace, related to the comfort women issue, was unveiled in front of the embassy in 2011, causing another lengthy diplomatic row between Japan and South Korea. In 2012 a Chinese man threw four Molotov cocktails at the embassy to voice his anger over the comfort women issue. In 2015 an elderly South Korean man set himself on fire during a weekly Wednesday demonstration.

See also
 Japan–South Korea relations
 List of Ambassadors from Japan to South Korea
 List of diplomatic missions in South Korea

References

External links

 

Seoul
Japan
Japan–South Korea relations
1965 establishments in South Korea
Jongno District